Felizardo Silvestre Bumba Ambrósio (25 December 1987), nicknamed "Miller", is an Angolan basketball power forward. He won a gold medal with the Angola national basketball team at the 2007 African Championship. Ambrosio also played in the 2008 Summer Olympics.

He is currently playing for Primeiro de Agosto at the Angolan major basketball league BAI Basket and at the Africa Champions Cup..

See also
 Angola national basketball team

References

External links
 

1987 births
Living people
Basketball players from Luanda
Angolan men's basketball players
Basketball players at the 2008 Summer Olympics
Olympic basketball players of Angola
Power forwards (basketball)
C.D. Primeiro de Agosto men's basketball players
African Games bronze medalists for Angola
African Games medalists in basketball
2010 FIBA World Championship players
Competitors at the 2011 All-Africa Games